Gail F. Forrest is an associate director of Human Performance and Engineering Research at Kessler Foundation and an associate professor in the Department of Physical Medicine & Rehabilitation at  New Jersey Medical School. She has also conducted more than 20 federal, state, and national clinical trials for patients with spinal cord injury. She is also part of the research team winning the Neuromod Prize in 2022 for new collaborative work on the development of neuromodulation therapies.

Education 
Gail Forrest received a Ph.D in biomechanics. from Temple University in 2001.

Career 
As a postdoctoral fellow at Kessler Foundation Research Center in 2002, Forrest received a grant funding by the New Jersey Commission on Spinal Cord Injury (SCI) Research to evaluate independent walking after incomplete spinal cord injury through body weight support treadmill training.

Forrest received state and federal funded grants to research on neuroplasticity, improvement in secondary consequences and restoration of function for individuals after SCI. She has published extensively in the area of neuroplasticity and the use of exoskeleton on posture and walking after SCI.

Forrest also collaborates with the Victory over Paralysis organization as part of the Epidural Simulation Program.

Awards and funding 
Forrest is part of the team that won the Neuromod Prize in 2022 for a proposal that presents a pathway for greater independence for people paralysed with spinal cord injury. This is a collaborative project including research teams from the Kessler Foundation, the University of Louisville, Medtronic, and the Johns Hopkins Applied Physics Lab. 

She also received major funding from the Craig H. Neilsen Foundation for her ongoing study titled “Epidural Spinal Cord Stimulation: Addressing Spasticity and Motor Function.”

References

External links 

 Gail F. Forrest at Google Scholar
 Lessons in leadership:  Steven Kirshblum and Gail Forrest  (video)
 In the news with Gail Forrest, Ph.D.  (video)

American medical academics

Living people
Year of birth missing (living people)
Temple University alumni
Rutgers University faculty
Women medical researchers
American medical researchers
Women bioengineers